Paul Edward Winston White, Baron Hanningfield (born 16 September 1940) is a British politician and a member of the House of Lords. He served in various leadership roles in local government as a Conservative and was influential in the establishment of the Local Government Association. He achieved notoriety in the Parliamentary expenses scandal, when he was convicted of false accounting and sent to prison. Following his release he was suspended from the House of Lords for a time.

White was created a Life Peer on 31 July 1998, as Baron Hanningfield, of Chelmsford in the County of Essex, and is thus known as Lord Hanningfield.

Biography
The son of Edward Ernest William White by his marriage to Irene Joyce Gertrude Williamson, White was educated at King Edward VI Grammar School, Chelmsford, and received a Nuffield Scholarship for Agriculture.

In 1962, White was appointed Chairman of the Young Farmers, and at the same time became a member of the Executive of Chelmsford Conservative Association, a position he held until 1999. He was first elected to Essex County Council in 1970 and served as Chairman of the council from 1989 to 1992. He was also chair of the Council of Local Education Authorities between 1990 and 1992, and leader of the Association of County Councils between 1995 and 1997.

In 1998, White was given a peerage, in recognition of his work in helping to establish the Local Government Association of England and Wales. From 1997 to 2001, Hanningfield was deputy chair and Conservative Group Leader of the Local Government Association. He served as leader of Essex County Council from 1998 to 1999, and from 2000 until his resignation in 2010. Hanningfield was also a member of the Court of Essex University and a Deputy Lieutenant of the County of Essex.

Lobbying for rural communities
On 18 March 2009 the Countryside Alliance awarded Hanningfield the Rural Vision 2009 Award for his work to protect and promote rural communities. The Alliance felt that the involvement and leadership he displayed by his opposition to the second runway at Stansted Airport and to post office closures showed he was a politician with the countryside's future most at heart.

Parliamentary expenses scandal

In February 2010, Hanningfield was charged with offences under section 17 of the Theft Act 1968 relating to false accounting for claims for overnight accommodation. He immediately resigned as the Opposition Spokesman for Communities, Local Government, and Transport. Later on that day, he also resigned as leader of Essex County Council, and David Cameron withdrew the party whip from him in parliament.

On 27 May 2010 Hanningfield, Jim Devine, Elliot Morley, and David Chaytor appeared at Southwark Crown Court for a preliminary hearing. Hanningfield was charged with six counts of false accounting and his trial at Chelmsford Crown Court began on 16 May 2011. Prosecuting counsel Clare Montgomery QC accused Hanningfield of claiming for overnight stays in London when he had in fact returned to his home in Essex. On one occasion, when he claimed reimbursement for an overnight stay in London, he was actually on a plane to India.

Hanningfield denied all charges. He told police he had been 'singled out'; in an interview in August 2009, he had told police: "I have done the same as 500 or 600 other peers." On 26 May 2011, Hanningfield was found guilty on all six counts.

On 1 July 2011, Hanningfield was sentenced to nine months' imprisonment, after the court heard evidence from his psychiatrist, Professor Valerie Cowey, stating that "he expressed suicidal ideas" and "he told me he would be absolutely crushed by a custodial sentence". The prosecution pointed out that he had been well enough to attend the House of Lords during the previous week. The sentence handed down was the shortest imposed on anyone convicted of dishonesty in the expenses scandal. Hanningfield's appeal against his conviction was rejected by the Court of Appeal on 20 July 2011.

On 12 September 2011, it was reported that Hanningfield had been released from prison on home detention curfew, after serving just a quarter of his nine-month sentence.

In October 2011, Hanningfield began a legal action against Essex Police for wrongful arrest on suspicion of fraudulent use of a county council credit card, a few days after he had been released from prison. He sent a letter before the claim informing them that he was seeking £3,000 for unlawful arrest and detention, £1,500 for trespass, and £2,000 in costs. In February 2013 he was awarded £3,500 damages for unlawful arrest and the search of his home without a search warrant. He was represented by the barrister Rupert Bowers.

In December 2011 the House Committee in the Lords recommended that Baroness Uddin and Lord Hanningfield should not be allowed back to the Lords until the outstanding expenses had been repaid. Hanningfield returned to the House of Lords in April 2012 after repaying £30,000, but did not speak again in the chamber until October 2013.

In September 2012 Hanningfield was ordered to repay a further £37,000 covering a six-year period of expenses, under the Proceeds of Crime Act. Hanningfield called this "unfair" and said that to pay it he would need to raise a mortgage and to take up after-dinner speaking and attend the House of Lords more often, earning the £300 daily attendance fee, to repay the mortgage.

In May 2014 it was announced that Hanningfield would likely be suspended from Parliament over the incident, and he was subsequently temporarily suspended from the House of Lords. His suspension ended in May 2015. Again represented by Rupert Bowers, the case was ultimately dropped when Parliament claimed privilege over the matters indicted.

Personal life
Hanningfield lives in the village of West Hanningfield in Essex with his Bernese mountain dog.

References

External links

2009-10 contributions in Parliament at Hansard
Biography at Dod's Parliamentary Companion

1940 births
 
Living people
Conservative Party (UK) life peers
People from the City of Chelmsford
British politicians convicted of fraud
Prisoners and detainees of England and Wales
British politicians convicted of crimes
English prisoners and detainees
Members of Essex County Council
Conservative Party (UK) councillors
Deputy Lieutenants of Essex
People educated at King Edward VI Grammar School, Chelmsford
Leaders of local authorities of England
Life peers created by Elizabeth II